Frontenac Islands is a township located in Frontenac County, Ontario, Canada, that encompasses a number of islands at the beginning of the Saint Lawrence River near the outlet of Lake Ontario, including: Arabella, Bayfield, Black Ant, Garden, Goose, Hickory, Horseshoe, Howe, Wolfe, and Simcoe.

The township was formed in 1998 when Howe Island Township and Wolfe Island Township were merged as part of the county's reorganization.

Communities
Of the several islands that make up Frontenac Islands, only three (Wolfe Island, Howe Island, and Simcoe Island ranked in descending order of year-round resident population) have  substantial permanent resident populations, and regularly-scheduled or on-demand marine ferry service provides year-round vehicle and emergency services access to those islands.

The other islands are accessible only by private boat to privately-owned docks.  Some of these islands have substantial numbers of homes and cottages, but are generally not populated during the winter months when ice build-up in Lake Ontario and the St. Lawrence River make boat access difficult or impossible.

Only Wolfe Island has a recognizable concentrated settlement: the village of Marysville, with around 400 inhabitants. The rest of the population is dispersed, mostly in lot groupings on or near the island shoreline, but with some housing found along the interior roads on either farm properties or on smaller non-farming lot severances.

In the nineteenth century, the islands had much larger populations.  Small population clusters were also found in the Port Alexandria, Port Metcalf and Scotch Settlement areas, all on Wolfe Island. These communities are now no more than names on the map.

Note: There were no "villages" at Port Alexandria, Port Metcalf or the Scotch Settlement. The Scotch Settlement was a farming area encompassing approximately 3,000 acres which was settled in the 1820s by Scottish clansmen moving west from Glengarry county.

Community groups and organizations

There are several community groups and organizations in Frontenac Islands. On Wolfe Island, these include the Wolfe Island Business and Tourism Association (WIBTA), the Community Medical Clinic, and the Wolfe Island Historical Society.

Education 
The town, along with Central Frontenac, South Frontenac and North Frontenac, sends students to schools part of the Limestone District School Board, based in neighboring Kingston.

Demographics 

According to the Canada 2006 Census:
Mother tongue:
 English as first language: 93.6%
 French as first language: 0.5%
 English and French as first language: 0%
 Other as first language: 5.9%

See also
List of townships in Ontario

References

External links

Lower-tier municipalities in Ontario
Municipalities in Frontenac County
Township municipalities in Ontario